Matti Haahti (born 8 June 1936) is a Finnish footballer. He played in 22 matches for the Finland national football team from 1957 to 1962.

References

1936 births
Living people
Finnish footballers
Finland international footballers
Place of birth missing (living people)
Association footballers not categorized by position